Rayzha Alimjan (born 15 July 1986) is a Chinese actress and model of Kazakh ethnicity.

Early life and education
Rayzha Alimjan was born in Haidian District of Beijing, on 15 July 1986, while her ancestral home is in Jinghe County, Xinjiang. Her maternal grandmother was a school teacher. Her father is a writer. She graduated from Beijing Film Academy.

Career
Rayzha Alimjan began her career as a fashion model when she was a high school student. 

She made her film debut in Flirting Scholar 2 (2010), playing a maidservant. 

Rayzha Alimjan's first notice came with her role as Concubine Ning on the 2011 historical television series Empresses in the Palace. 

In 2012, she received her first leading role in a series called Ia Ia, I Do.

In 2013, she starred opposite Qi Wei, Melvin Sia, Chen He, Lou Yixiao, and Zhang Danfeng in the romantic comedy television series Love Destiny.

In 2014, she landed a guest role on Young Sherlock. 

Rayzha Alimjan was cast in Xu Jinglei's romance film Somewhere Only We Know (2015), playing the girlfriend of Juck Zhang's character. 

In 2016, she headlined three films: Inside or Outside, Kill Time (film) and Never Said Goodbye. She had a supporting role in Singing All Along, a television adaptation based on the romance novel Splendid and Beautiful Rivers and Mountains by Li Xin.

Rayzha Alimjan played the female lead role in the romantic comedy film La Historia Du Un Amor (2017), alongside Zheng Kai, who played her boyfriend. That same year, she played a supporting role in Tribes and Empires: Storm of Prophecy, starring Huang Xuan, Shawn Dou, Xu Lu, Zhang Jianing and Janice Man and directed by Cao Dun. 

In 2018, she played Gu Xueying, the lead role in Yang Yang's war drama The Snow Queen, costarring Dylan Kuo.

She had a major role in the historical suspense drama The Longest Day in Chang'an (2019), which starred Lei Jiayin and Jackson Yee.  

In 2021, she had key supporting role in Minning Town, a 23-episode television series based on the decades-long battle against poverty northwest China's Ningxia Hui Autonomous Region.

Personal life
On 5 December 2020, she announced that she had given birth to a daughter on her personal Sina Weibo account.

Filmography

Film

Television

Variety show

References

External links

1986 births
Living people
Actresses from Beijing
Actresses from Xinjiang
Beijing Film Academy alumni
21st-century Chinese actresses
Chinese people of Kazakhstani descent
Chinese television actresses
Chinese film actresses